Kenneth George "Ken" Binmore,  (born 27 September 1940) is an English mathematician, economist, and game theorist, a Professor Emeritus of Economics at University College London (UCL) and a Visiting Emeritus Professor of Economics at the University of Bristol. As a founder of modern economic theory of bargaining (with Nash and Rubinstein), he made important contributions to the foundations of game theory, experimental economics, evolutionary game theory and analytical philosophy. He took up economics after holding the Chair of Mathematics at the London School of Economics. The switch has put him at the forefront of developments in game theory. His other interests include political and moral philosophy, decision theory, and statistics. He has written over 100 scholarly papers and 14 books.

Education
Binmore studied mathematics at Imperial College London, where he was awarded a 1st class-honours BSc with a Governor's Prize, and later a PhD in mathematical analysis.

Research
Binmore's major research contributions are to the theory of bargaining and its testing in the laboratory. He is a pioneer of experimental economics. He began his experimental work in the 1980s when most economists thought that game theory would not work in the laboratory. Binmore and his collaborators established that game theory can often predict the behaviour of experienced players very well in laboratory settings, even in the case of human bargaining behaviour, a particularly challenging case for game theory. This has brought him into conflict with some proponents of behavioural economics who emphasise the importance of other-regarding or social preferences, and argue that their findings threaten traditional game theory.

Binmore's work in political and moral philosophy began in the 1980s when he first applied bargaining theory to John Rawls' original position. His search for the philosophical foundations of the original position took him first to Kant's works, and then to Hume. Hume inspired Binmore to contribute to a naturalistic science of morals that seeks foundations for Rawlsian ideas about fairness norms in biological and social evolution. The result was his two-volume Game Theory and the Social Contract, an ambitious attempt to lay the foundations for a genuine science of morals using the theory of games. In Game Theory and the Social Contract Binmore proposes a naturalistic reinterpretation of John Rawls' original position that reconciles his egalitarian theory of justice with John Harsanyi's utilitarian theory. His recent Natural Justice provides a nontechnical synthesis of this work.

Affiliations
In 1995 Binmore became one of the founding directors of the Centre for Economic Learning and Social Evolution (ELSE), an interdisciplinary research centre involving economists, psychologists, anthropologists and mathematicians based at University College London. Funded by the Economic and Social Research Council, ELSE pursues basic research on evolutionary and learning approaches to games and society and applies its theoretical findings to practical problems in government and business.

While Director of ELSE, Binmore became widely known as the "poker-playing economic theorist", who netted the British government £22 billion when he led the team that designed the third-generation (3G) telecommunications auction in 2000. He went on to design and implement 3G spectrum auctions in Belgium, Denmark, Greece, Israel and Hong Kong.

Binmore is Emeritus Professor of Economics at University College London, Visiting Emeritus Professor of Economics at the University of Bristol and Visiting Professor in the Department of Philosophy, Logic and Scientific Method at the London School of Economics. He has held similar positions at the London School of Economics, Caltech, the University of Pennsylvania and the University of Michigan. He is a Fellow of the Econometric Society and the British Academy. He was appointed a CBE in the New Year's Honours List 2001 for contributions to game theory and to designing the UK 3G telecommunications auctions. He was elected a Foreign Honorary Member of the American Academy of Arts and Sciences in 2002. In 2007 he became an Honorary Research Fellow in the Department of Philosophy at the University of Bristol and an Honorary Fellow of the Centre for Philosophy at the London School of Economics.

Books
1977: Mathematical Analysis: A Straightforward Approach. New York: Cambridge University Press
1980: Foundations of Analysis: Book 1: Logic, Sets and Numbers. Cambridge University Press
1980: Foundations of Analysis: Book 2: Topological Ideas. Cambridge University Press
1986: Economic Organizations As Games (co-ed. Partha Dasgupta). Basil Blackwell
1987: The Economics of Bargaining (co-ed. Partha Dasgupta). Basil Blackwell. Includes many of his early papers on Nash bargaining theory
1990: Essays on the Foundations of Game Theory. Basil Blackwell. Includes "Modelling Rational Players I and II" from Economics and Philosophy
1991: Fun and Games: A Text on Game Theory. D. C. Heath and Company
1994: Game Theory and the Social Contract, Volume 1: Playing Fair. Cambridge: MIT Press
1998: Game Theory and the Social Contract, Volume 2: Just Playing. Cambridge: MIT Press
2002: Calculus: Concepts and Methods (with Joan Davies). Cambridge University Press
2005: Natural Justice. New York: Oxford University Press
2007: Playing for Real – A Text on Game Theory. New York: Oxford University Press
2007: Does Game Theory Work? The Bargaining Challenge. MIT Press. Papers on bargaining experiments with comments on challenges to game theory posed by behavioural school of economics
2008: Game Theory: A Very Short Introduction. Oxford University Press. Mini-biographies of many founders of subject, including John Nash; overview of a cutting-edge field with successes in evolutionary biology, economics and other disciplines
2009: Rational Decisions. Princeton University Press. Explains foundations of Bayesian decision theory and why Leonard Savage restricted it to small worlds. Argues that Bayesian approach inadequate in a large world
2021: Imaginary philosophical dialogues : between sages down the ages. Cham: Springer.

Selected articles
With A. Rubinstein and A. Wolinsky, "The Nash Bargaining Solution in Economic Modeling", RAND Journal of Economics, 1986
"Perfect Equilibria in Bargaining Models," in K. Binmore and P. Dasgupta, editors, The Economics of Bargaining, Basil Blackwell, Oxford, 1987
"Modeling Rational Players I and II", Economics and Philosophy, 1987
With A. Shaked and J. Sutton, "An Outside Option Experiment", Quarterly Journal of Economics, 1989
"Debayesing Game Theory," in: B. Skyrms, editor, Studies in Logic and the Foundations of Game Theory: Proceedings of the Ninth International Congress of Logic, Methodology and the Philosophy of Science, Kluwer, Dordrecht, 1992
With L. Samuelson, "Evolutionary Stability in Repeated Games Played by Finite Automata," Journal of Economic Theory, 57, 1992
With J. Gale and L. Samuelson, "Learning to be Imperfect: The Ultimatum Game," Games and Economic Behavior, 8, 1995
With L. Samuelson, "Muddling Through: Noisy Equilibrium Selection," Journal of Economic Theory, 74, 1997
"Rationality and Backward Induction", Journal of Economic Methodology, 4, 1997
With J. McCarthy, G. Ponti, A. Shaked and L. Samuelson, "A Backward Induction Experiment," Journal of Economic Theory, 104, 2002
With P. Klemperer, "The Biggest Auction Ever: The Sale of the British 3G Telecom Licences," Economic Journal, 112, 2002
With L. Samuelson, "The Evolution of Focal Points," Games and Economic Behavior, 55, 2006
With A. Shaked, "Experimental Economics: Where Next?" Journal of Economic Behavior and Organization, 2009

Interview with Binmore
"The Origin of Fairness" in Alex Voorhoeve Conversations on Ethics. Oxford University Press, 2009.  Binmore's approach to moral philosophy

References

External links

Professor Binmore's ELSE page at UCL
Professor Binmore's University of Bristol page
Binmore's review of Robert Axelrod's Complexity of Cooperation: Agent-Based Models of Competition and Collaboration, 1997
One-armed economists show big business how to play the game. Binmore article on British 3G telecoms auction for The Independent, 29 May 2000
Another 5 Numbers: Game Theory. Simon Singh interviews Binmore for BBC Radio 4 on bluffing in poker and British 3G telecoms auction, 31 October 2003
The dividend. Review of Binmore's Natural Justice by Brian Skyrms in Times Literary Supplement, 8 July 2005
Symposium on Binmore's Natural Justice in Politics, Philosophy & Economics, 1 February 2006, Volume 5, No. 1
Binmore's "Making Decisions in Large Worlds". Recent paper arguing for a need to look beyond Bayesian decision theory to answer the general problem of making rational decisions under uncertainty
Binmore and Shaked's "Experimental Economics: Science or What?". Revised version of Shaked's critique of literature on "inequity aversion", warning that economists may lose respect of other disciplines in accepting claims about human behaviour without critical examination of data from which claims supposedly derive, or methodology employed in analysing the data
"Rules of the Game". A recent article in Prospect magazine in which Binmore argues that governments should take note of the theory of "mechanism design" — work on which recently won three economists the Nobel Prize.

1940 births
Academics of University College London
Alumni of Imperial College London
British economists
Fellows of the American Academy of Arts and Sciences
Fellows of the Econometric Society
Game theorists
Living people
University of Pennsylvania faculty
University of Michigan faculty
Welsh philosophers
Academics of the London School of Economics
Honorary Fellows of the London School of Economics
20th-century British philosophers
21st-century British philosophers